Jörg Wilhalm was an early 16th-century German fencing master, hatmaker, and citizen of Augsburg.

There are six fechtbuchs attributed to Wilhalm:
 1522 Cod.I.6.4°.5, 47 folia, Augsburg University library, bought by Paulus Hector Mair in 1552.
 1522 Cod.I.6.2°.3, 43 folia, Augsburg University library, bought by Mair in 1561.
 1523 Cod.I.6.2°.2, 72 folia, Augsburg University library, bought by Mair in 1544.
 1523 Cgm 3711, 102 folia, München.
 Cgm 3712, 212 folia, München.
 MS 862

MS Cgm 3711 is peculiar in that some of the fencers are represented in humorous carnival costumes.

See also 
 Fechtbuch
 Historical European Martial Arts

References 
 Hils, Hans-Peter, Meister Johann Liechtenauers Kunst des langen Schwertes, Lang (1985).

German historical fencers
Milliners
Year of birth missing
Year of death missing